WKNI-LP is a low power television station in Andalusia, Alabama, broadcasting on channel 25. The station is owned by Phoenix Rising Production, Inc., and is affiliated with Launch TV network.

External links
 WKNI Web Site
 

KNI-LP
Television channels and stations established in 2005
2005 establishments in Alabama